Heart Over Mind is the twenty-ninth studio album by American country music singer-songwriter Tammy Wynette. It was released on September 3, 1990, by Epic Records.

Chart performance
The album peaked at No. 64 on the Billboard Top Country Albums chart. The album's lead single, Let's Call It a Day", peaked at No. 57 on the Billboard Hot Country Singles & Tracks chart. The second single, "I'm Turning You Loose", did not chart. The album's third and final single, "What Goes with Blue", reached a peak position of No. 56.

Track listing

Personnel

Lea Jane Berinati - backing vocals
Larry Byrom - electric guitar
Kathy Ciavola - backing vocals
Gene Eichelberger - recording and mixing
Paul Franklin - steel guitar
Bill Hullett - acoustic guitar
Roy Huskey, Jr. - bass guitar
Bill Johnson - album art design
Toni Jolene -  backing vocals
Larry Keith - backing vocals
Harry Langdon - album photography
Tim Mensy - acoustic guitar
Shawn McLean - recording and mixing assistant
Terry McMillan harmonica
Bob Montgomery - producer
Cathy Moore - production assistant
Kim Morrison - backing vocals
Ron Oats - keyboards, arrangements
Denny Purcell - mastering
Jim Vest - steel guitar
Lonnie Wilson - drums, percussion
Bob Wray - bass guitar
Tammy Wynette - lead vocals
Jonathan Yudkin - mandolin

Chart positions

Album

Singles

References

1990 albums
Epic Records albums
Tammy Wynette albums
Albums produced by Bob Montgomery (songwriter)